The 2004 Saint Francis Cougars football team represented the University of Saint Francis, located in Fort Wayne, Indiana, in the 2004 NAIA football season. They were led by head coach Kevin Donley, who served his 7th year as the first and only head coach in the history of Saint Francis football.  The Cougars played their home games at Bishop John M. D'Arcy Stadium and were members of the Mid-States Football Association (MSFA) Mideast League (MEL). The Cougars finished in 1st place in the MSFA MEL division, and they received an automatic bid to the 2004 postseason NAIA playoffs.

The 2004 Cougars finished the regular season undefeated.  In the postseason playoffs, the Cougars advanced to the national championship game where they lost to the Fighting Saints of Carroll, 15-13 in double overtime.

Schedule 
(13-1 overall, 7-0 conference)
The 2004 season was the first of three consecutive trips to the NAIA championship game in Savannah, TN.  The Cougars finished as runner-up in the nation with its 2-point loss to Carroll (MT).  As a tribute to this team's success, Donley was named the NAIA National Coach of the Year for the second time.

National awards and honors
   Senior running back Cory Jacquay was named as the 2004 NAIA Football Player of the Year.  This was the first time in Cougar football history that one of their players received the award.

Ranking movements

References

Saint Francis
Saint Francis Cougars football seasons
Saint Francis Cougars football